Solanum sisymbriifolium is commonly known as vila-vila,  sticky nightshade, red buffalo-bur, the fire-and-ice plant, litchi tomato, or Morelle de Balbis.

The small edible fruits are red on the outside and yellow inside. It grows inside a spiny, green husk. The fruit is ripe when it is easily removed from the stem. The flavor resembles sour cherries and a little bit like a tomato.

This plant has been used as a trap crop to protect potatoes from potato cyst nematode.  The stems and leaves contain solasodine which makes the plant very resistant to many pests and diseases, with the exception of potato beetles and tomato hornworms.  It can also be used as a hedge plant to keep animals out of a garden, because it is covered with prickles (erroneously called thorns).

Synonyms

The sticky nightshade has been described under a number of illegitimate scientific names, many of them quite ambiguous homonyms:
 Solanum balbisii Dunal
 Solanum bipinnatifidum Larrañaga
 Solanum brancaefolium Jacq.
 Solanum decurrens Balb.
 Solanum edule Vell.
 Solanum formosum Weinm.
 Solanum inflatum Hornem.
 Solanum mauritianum Willd. ex Roth (preoccupied)
 Solanum opuliflorum Port. ex Walp. (nomen nudum)
 Solanum opuliflorum Port. ex Dunal (nomen nudum)
 Solanum rogersii S.Moore
 Solanum sabeanum Buckley
 Solanum subviscidum Schrank
 Solanum thouinii C.C.Gmel.
 Solanum viscidum Schweigg.
 Solanum viscosum Lag.
 Solanum xanthacanthum Willd. ex Walp. (nomen nudum)

Several forms and varieties have been named, but these are generally not considered distinct today:
 Solanum sisymbriifolium var. purpureiflorum Dunal
 Solanum sisymbriifolium forma albiflorum Kuntze
 Solanum sisymbriifolium var. bipinnatipartitum Dunal
 Solanum sisymbriifolium var. brevilobum Dunal
 Solanum sisymbriifolium var. gracile Mattos
 Solanum sisymbriifolium var. heracleifolium Sendtn.
 Solanum sisymbriifolium forma lilacinum Kuntze
 Solanum sisymbriifolium var. macrocarpum Kuntze
 Solanum sisymbriifolium var. oligospermum (Sendtn.) Dunal

Distribution

Native

South America
Argentina, Bolivia, Chile, Colombia, Ecuador, Paraguay, Peru
Brazil
Rio Grande do Sul

Introduced

Europe
Austria, Belgium, Czech Republic, Denmark, Ireland, Estonia, Finland, France, Germany, Hungary, Latvia, Lithuania, Morocco, Netherlands, Norway, Portugal, Spain, Sweden, Ukraine, United Kingdom
Italy 
Sicily - invasive

Asia
Republic of Korea
Bangladesh
Taiwan
Japan
Turkey
India
Gujarat
China
Guangdong, Yunnan

Africa
Benin, Kenya, South Africa, Republic of the Congo, Eswatini, Namibia

North America
Canada
Mexico
United States - ~64% of the country is suitable for S. sisymbriifolium. Predicted to eventually be absent from most of Alaska, Montana, and Wisconsin, and to never enter North Dakota.
Alabama, Arizona, California, Delaware, Florida, Georgia, Iowa, Louisiana, Massachusetts, Mississippi, New Jersey, New York, North Carolina, Oregon, Pennsylvania, South Carolina, Texas
ABSENT from Idaho

Oceania
Australia
New South Wales, Victoria, Western Australia
New Zealand

References

External links

 
 

sisymbriifolium
Edible Solanaceae
Fruit vegetables
Flora of South America
Flora of Brazil
Flora of the Cerrado
Berries